Swords and Crowns and Rings is a Miles Franklin Award-winning novel by Australian author Ruth Park. It mainly follows the stories of two children in a town in rural New South Wales across three decades at the start of the 20th century. 

The primary protagonist, Jackie Hanna, is born a "dwarf" in 1907 to Walter and Peggy Hanna, two grocers in Kingsland, NSW. Jackie's father Walter dies during his childhood, and his mother remarries to a veteran of the Boer War. The secondary protagonist, Dorothy "Cushie" Moy, is born to a wealthy family; her father is a banker and her mother the daughter of a newspaper tycoon. In their youth, the two protagonists fall in love, and much of the book arcs around the circumstances and misfortunes that keep them apart. In particular, a substantial portion of the book focuses on Jackie's experiences as an migrant worker through the Great Depression in Australia, including interactions with New South Wales Premier Jack Lang.

The book is divided into six chapters:
1. Jackie Hanna, Cushie Moy 1907–1918
2. Jackie Hanna 1924
3. Cushie Moy 1924–1925
4. Jackie Hanna 1924–1929
5. Jackie Hanna 1931
6. Jackie Hanna, Cushie Moy 1931–1932

References

Middlemiss.org

1977 Australian novels
Miles Franklin Award-winning works
Novels by Ruth Park